Framwellgate School Durham is a large state secondary school and sixth form centre located in the Framwellgate Moor area of Durham City, County Durham, England. It was granted academy status in 2011.

Composition
At the time of its most recent inspection in May, 2018, the school had approximately 1000 pupils, of which around 120 were in the sixth form.

The school serves Framwellgate Moor and the nearby Newton Hall estate. However, some pupils travel greater distances, typically from outlying former pit villages.

In the last two Ofsted reports, in May 2018 and December 2015, FSD was graded as a school that "requires improvement".

History
The first school buildings were opened in 1965, with most of the other blocks following over the next decade. The school operated as a comprehensive since 1971.

The school was formerly known as Framwellgate Moor Comprehensive School, and was commonly known by the initials FMCS.

The school was granted Specialist Science College status in 2003.

In 2011 the school was granted independent academy status as part of the UK Conservative government's "Big Society" education plans. This means that the school now has greater control over their education and teaching; however, it remains state-run.

In 2016, the school was granted £2m funding to build a new sports centre to replace the former one; the building was completed in September 2017.

Performance
In 2007, 77% of pupils taking GCSEs achieved 5 or more at grade C or above. In the sixth form in the same year, the average level 3 point score was 607 per student.

The school received an 'Outstanding', grade 1 for the Ofsted inspection that took place in October 2005.

In the 2008 Ofsted report the school received a 'Good', grade 2.

In the most recent two inspections of the school, in May 2018 and November 2015, the school was judged as 'Requires Improvement', grade 3 on both occasions

Notable former pupils

David Duke, former Swindon Town and Darlington footballer
Tony Hackworth, former Leeds United footballer
Andy Rafferty, current Hartlepool United footballer
Mark Summerbell, former Middlesbrough footballer
Craig Tracey, British Conservative Party MP
Rachel Sweeney, television presenter for GB News

References

External links
Framwellgate School Durham

Educational institutions established in 1965
1965 establishments in England
Schools in Durham, England
Secondary schools in County Durham
Academies in County Durham